The Solar Film (also known as A Short Film on Solar Energy)  is a 1979 short film  by Elaine and Saul Bass and produced by Michael Britton. The film was financed through Redford's Wildwood Enterprises with 50-50 funding coming from Philanthropist Norton Simon and Warner Communications and a budget of $402,699.

Summary
This film takes a look at the short history of solar energy, what it is and how can it be used culturally and biologically.

Mike Oldfield's Tubular Bells was used in the film.

The film was commissioned by Robert Redford who also served as executive producer.

Accolades
1980: Nominated for Academy Award for Best Live Action Short Film

See also
 Why Man Creates, Saul Bass's 1968 Oscar-winning documentary short about creativity

External links

References

American short films
1979 films
Environmental films
Films directed by Saul Bass
Solar energy
1979 short films
1970s English-language films